Bec Abbey, formally the Abbey of Our Lady of Bec, is a Benedictine monastic foundation in the Eure département, in the Bec valley midway between the cities of Rouen and Bernay. It is located in Le Bec Hellouin, Normandy, France, and was the most influential abbey of the 12th-century Anglo-Norman kingdom.

Like all abbeys, Bec maintained annals of the house but uniquely its first  abbots also received individual biographies, brought together by the monk of Bec, Milo Crispin. Because of the abbey's cross-Channel influence, these hagiographic lives sometimes disclose historical information of more than local importance.

Name
The name of the abbey derives from the bec, or stream, that runs nearby. The word derives from the Scandinavian root, bekkr.

First foundation

The abbey was founded in 1034 by Saint Herluin, whose life was written by Gilbert Crispin, Abbot of Westminster, formerly of Bec, and collated with three other lives by Milo Crispin. Abbey construction began in 1034 and continued through 1035. Further lands were added through 1040. Saint Herluin was a Norman knight who in about 1031 left the court of Gilbert, Count of Brionne, to devote himself to a life of religion: the commune of Le Bec Hellouin preserves his name. One hundred and thirty-six monks made their profession while Herluin was in charge.

With the arrival of Lanfranc of Pavia, Bec became a focus of 11th century intellectual life. Lanfranc, who was already famous for his lectures at Avranches, came to teach as prior and master of the monastic school, but left in 1062, to become abbot of St. Stephen's Abbey, Caen, and later Archbishop of Canterbury. He was followed as abbot by Anselm, also later an Archbishop of Canterbury, as was the fifth abbot, Theobald of Bec. Many distinguished ecclesiastics, probably including the future Pope Alexander II and Saint Ivo of Chartres, were educated in the school at Bec.

The life of the founder (Vita Herluini) was written by Gilbert Crispin. Archbishop Lanfranc also wrote a Chronicon Beccense of the life of Herlui. Milo Crispin's biography of the first four abbots was published at Paris in 1648.

The followers of William the Conqueror supported the abbey, enriching it with extensive properties in England. Bec also owned and managed St Neots Priory as well as a number of other British foundations, including Goldcliff Priory in Monmouthshire founded in 1113 by Robert de Chandos. The village of Tooting Bec, now a London suburb, is so named because the abbey owned the land.

Bec Abbey was the original burial place of the Empress Matilda, whose bones were later transferred to Rouen Cathedral.

Bec Abbey was damaged during the Wars of Religion and left a ruin in the French Revolution but the 15th-century St. Nicholas Tower from the medieval monastery is still standing.

Second foundation
In 1948 the site was re-settled as the Abbaye de Notre-Dame du Bec by Olivetan monks led by Dom Grammont, who effected some restorations. The abbey is known for its links with Anglicanism and has been visited by successive archbishops of Canterbury. The abbey library contains the John Graham Bishop deposit of 5,000 works concerning Anglicanism.

Today the Abbey is probably best known for the pottery the monks produce.

List of abbots
The following is a list of the abbots:

 1034–1078: Herluin (or Hellouin)
 1078–1093: Anselm (afterwards archbishop of Canterbury)
 1093–1124: Guillaume de Montfort-sur-Risle
 1124–1136: Boson
 1136–1138: Theobald (afterwards archbishop of Canterbury)
 1139–1149: Létard
 1149–1179: Roger de Bailleul (elected archbishop of Canterbury, but declined the position)
 1179–1187: Osbern
 1187–1194: Roger II
 1195–1197: Gauthier
 1197–1198: Hugues de Cauquainvilliers
 1198–1211: Guillaume Le Petit
 1211–1223: Richard de Saint-Léger alias de Bellevue (afterwards bishop of Évreux)
 1223–1247: Henri de Saint-Léger
 1247–1265: Robert de Clairbec
 1265–1272: Jean de Guineville
 1272–1281: Pierre de la Cambe
 1281–1304: Ymer de Saint-Ymer
 1304–1327: Gilbert de Saint-Étienne
 1327–1335: Geoffroy Faé (afterwards Bishop of Évreux)
 1335–1351: Jean des Granges
 1351–1361: Robert de Rotes alias Couraye
 1361–1388: Guillaume de Beuzeville alias Popeline
 1388–1391: Estout d’Estouteville
 1391–1399: Geoffroy Harenc
 1399–1418: Guillaume d’Auvillars
 1418–1430: Robert Vallée
 1430–1446: Thomas Frique
 1446–1452: Jean de La Motte
 1452–1476: Geoffroy d’Épaignes
 1476–1484: Jean Boucard
 1484–1491: Robert d’Évreux
 1491–1515: Guillaume Guérin
 1515–1515: Jean Ribault
 1515–1520: Adrien Gouffier de Boissy (created cardinal in 1515, also bishop of Coutances and the administrator of the see of Albi)
 1520–1533: Jean d'Orléans-Longueville (also archbishop of Toulouse and bishop of Orléans, created cardinal in 1533)
 1534–1543: Jean Le Veneur (also Bishop of Lisieux)
 1544–1557: Jacques d'Annebaut (created cardinal in 1544, also Bishop of Lisieux)
 1558–1572: Louis de Lorraine (created cardinal in 1553, also successively bishop of Troyes, archbishop of Sens and bishop of Metz)
 1572–1591: Claude de Lorraine
 1591–1597: Emeric de Vic
 1597–1661: Dominique de Vic (also archbishop of Auch)
 1661–1664: vacant
 1664–1707: Jacques-Nicolas Colbert (also archbishop of Rouen)
 1707–1717: Roger de La Rochefoucauld
 1717–1771: Louis de Bourbon-Condé
 1771–1782: vacant
 1782–1790: Yves-Alexandre de Marbeuf (also bishop of Autun, later archbishop of Lyon)
 1790–1948: vacant
 1948–1986: 
 1988–1990: Philippe Aubin
 1990–1996: Philibert Zobel
 1996–2020: Paul-Emmanuel Clénet

See also

List of Benedictine monasteries in France
St Werburgh's Abbey
Povington Priory
Tooting Bec
Weedon Bec

Notes

References

Citations

Bibliography

 Anonymous. Chronique du Bec et Chronique de François Carré (ed. A.-A. Porée). Rouen: Meétŕie, 1883.
 Anonymous.  De libertate Beccensis monasterii. In Giles Constable (ed.) and Bernard S. Smith (trans.), Three Treatises from Bec on the Nature of Monastic Life. Toronto: Univ. of Toronto Press, 2008.
 Anselm. Sancti Anselmi Cantuariensis archiepiscopi Opera Omnia (ed. F.S. Schmitt). Stuttgart: Frommann, 1968.
 Chibnall, Marjorie. The English Lands of the Abbey of Bec. Oxford: OUP, 1968 [1946]. 
 Crouch, David. The Beaumont Twins: The Roots and Branches of Power in the Twelfth Century. Cambridge: CUP, 1986.
 Gazeau, Véronique. “From Bec to Canterbury: Between Cloister and World, the Legacy of Anselm, a personne d’autorité.” In Giles E.M. Gasper and Ian Logan (edd.), Saint Anselm of Canterbury and His Legacy. Toronto: Pontifical Institute of Mediaeval Studies, 2012.
 Milo Crispin, "Vita venerabilis Willelmi abbatis Beccensis tertii." In Patrologia Latina, vol. 150, coll. 713-724.
 Orderic Vitalis, The Ecclesiastical History (ed. M. Chibnall). Oxford: OUP, 1969 (vols. 1-2) and 1975 (vols. 3-4).
 Pohl, Benjamin and Laura Gathagan (edd.). A Companion to the Abbey of Le Bec in the Middle Ages. Leiden: Brill, forthcoming.
 Porée, Adolphe-André. Histoire de l’abbaye du Bec. Évreux: Hérissey, 1901. 
 Vaughn, Salley. Anselm of Bec and Robert of Meulan: The Innocence of the Dove and the Wisdom of the Serpent. Berkeley: Univ. Calif. Press, 1987. 
 .

External links

  Abbaye de Notre-Dame du Bec: official website
 Le Bec Hellouin: official website
  gite site with details and photos
 

Benedictine monasteries in France
1034 establishments in Europe
1030s establishments in France
Buildings and structures in Eure
Christian monasteries established in the 11th century
Churches in Eure
Monuments of the Centre des monuments nationaux